Gary Hug is an American amateur astronomer and a prolific discoverer of minor planets, who, along with Graham E. Bell, operates the Farpoint Observatory and Sandlot Observatory  in Kansas, United States.

He is the co-discoverer of comet 178P/Hug-Bell and was awarded twice a Gene Shoemaker NEO Grant for improved near-Earth object searches in 2009 and 2018, respectively. Hug also represents the Northeast Kansas Amateur Astronomer's League.

List of discovered minor planets

References

External links 
  
 Tracking Asteroids From A Backyard In Kansas, interview with Gary Hug
 This Amateur Astronomer Built An Observatory In His Backyard, Popular Science, by Sarah Fecht,  21 June 2016

20th-century American astronomers
Discoverers of asteroids
Discoverers of comets
Living people
Year of birth missing (living people)